Mohammad Rubel Hossain (born 01 Jan 1990) is a Bangladeshi cricketer.  He made his international debut for Bangladesh in January 2009 aged 19.  He has the highest bowling average of any pacer who has bowled at least 2,000 deliveries in Test cricket. He is a quick bowler with a slingy action similar to Lasith Malinga's. Hossain holds the record of the fastest bowled delivery (149.5kph) by a Bangladeshi cricketer.

Early and domestic career
Hossain's first-class debut arrived for Chittagong Division in 2007, where he picked up match figures of 1/137 against Khulna Division. After a string of good performances in the National Cricket League, he was selected to play for the Bangladesh Under-19 team, and soon after, the Bangladesh A team.

The Bangladesh Cricket Board in 2012 founded the six-team Bangladesh Premier League, a twenty20 tournament to be held in February that year. An auction was held for teams to buy players, and Hossain was bought by the Sylhet Royals for $70,000. In October 2018, he was named in the squad for the Dhaka Dynamites team, following the draft for the 2018–19 Bangladesh Premier League. In November 2019, he was selected to play for the Chattogram Challengers in the 2019–20 Bangladesh Premier League.

Hossain innovated a technique of delivery named 'Butterfly'.

International career
Hossain was named in the One Day International squad for the tri-series with Sri Lanka and Zimbabwe and made his debut in the third game of the round-robin stage, a game Bangladesh needed to win to progress to the final. He cleaned up the middle-order and tail-enders with a 4-wicket haul in 5.3 overs. He also played in the tri-series final, where he had a poor end to the game, but retained his place for the three ODI series against Zimbabwe soon after. More good performances led to his name being named in the Test squad to face the West Indies for the first time. He made his debut at Arnos Vale, and took three wickets in West Indies' 1st innings, and also formed a good 10th wicket partnership with Shahadat Hossain in Bangladesh's first innings.

Hossain has also featured in two Twenty20 matches, both coming in the 2009 ICC World Twenty20. He bowled 149.5 km/h in a warm-up game of 2009 ICC World Twenty20.

His best ODI figure of 6/26 vs New Zealand at Mirpur, where he also took a hat-trick was nominated to be one of the best ODI bowling performance of the year 2013 by ESPNcricinfo.

He consistently bowled around 145 km/h in the 2015 Cricket World Cup.

In April 2018, Hossain was one of ten cricketers to be awarded a central contract by the Bangladesh Cricket Board (BCB) ahead of the 2018 season. In April 2019, he was named in Bangladesh's squad for the 2019 Cricket World Cup. In September 2021, he was named as one of two reserve players in Bangladesh's squad for the 2021 ICC Men's T20 World Cup. On 26 October 2021, he was added to Bangladesh's main squad for the tournament, after Mohammad Saifuddin was ruled out due to a back injury.

Controversies
Bangladeshi police arrested Hossain after Bangladeshi actress Naznin Akter Happy filed rape charges. He was in custody for three days, later the court granted him bail to participate for the 2015 Cricket World Cup. On Bangladesh's victory over England, in which Hossain played a starring role, Nazneen withdrew the charges.  Because of Rubel's performance against England, Happy's lawyer, Debul Day, ended his participation in the case saying "I no longer wish to fight against Rubel after seeing Bangladesh succeed. Rubel should feel no pressure."

References

External links

1990 births
Living people
Bangladesh Test cricketers
Bangladesh One Day International cricketers
Bangladesh Twenty20 International cricketers
Bangladeshi cricketers
Chittagong Division cricketers
Khulna Division cricketers
Cricketers at the 2011 Cricket World Cup
Cricketers at the 2015 Cricket World Cup
One Day International hat-trick takers
Asian Games medalists in cricket
Cricketers at the 2014 Asian Games
Asian Games bronze medalists for Bangladesh
Medalists at the 2014 Asian Games
Sylhet Strikers cricketers
Gazi Tank cricketers
Prime Bank Cricket Club cricketers
Legends of Rupganj cricketers
Chattogram Challengers cricketers
Bangladesh South Zone cricketers
Bangladesh A cricketers
People from Bagerhat District
Rangpur Riders cricketers
Dhaka Dominators cricketers